Snoqualmie Lake Potholes is a set of freshwater lakes located southeast Snoqualmie Lake, in King County, Washington. Self-issued Alpine Lake Wilderness permit required for transit within the Big Snow Mountain area. Because Snoqualmie Lake Potholes are at the heart of the Alpine Lakes Wilderness, the lake is a popular area for hiking, swimming, and fishing rainbow trout and cutthroat trout.

Location 
The Snoqualmie Lake Potholes are located on the north skirt of Little Bulger mountain. Other alpine mountains border the south ridges of the lake, including  Big Snow Mountain,  Sorcery Mountain, and  Galleon Mountain.

Geology 
Most of the region is underlain by medium to coarsely crystalline granodiorite which are exposed on the shores of the lakes.

Climate 
The Snoqualmie Lake Potholes are located in a hemiboreal climate, part of the marine west coast climate zone of western North America. The warmest month is August, with an average temperature of 16° C, and the coldest month is December, at an average of −6° C. The wettest month is January, with 396 millimeters of rain, and the least in July, with 38 millimeters of rain.

See also 
 List of lakes of the Alpine Lakes Wilderness

References 

Lakes of King County, Washington
Lakes of the Alpine Lakes Wilderness
Okanogan National Forest